Colored people's time is an American expression referring to a stereotype of African Americans as frequently being late.

Colored People's Time may also refer to:
 a 1960s public interest program by Detroit Public Television
 a 1980s play written by Leslie Lee which consisted of 13 vignettes of African American history